Scott Municipal Airport  is a public-use airport located four nautical miles (7 km) southwest of the central business district of Oneida, a city in Scott County, Tennessee, United States. The airport is owned by Scott County. It is located adjacent to the Big South Fork Airpark, a gated community and residential airpark.

Though most U.S. airports use the same three-letter location identifier for the FAA and IATA, this airport is assigned SCX by the FAA but has no designation from the IATA, which assigns SCX to Salina Cruz, Oaxaca, Mexico.

Facilities and aircraft 
It has one asphalt paved runway designated 5/23, which measures 5,505 by 75 feet (1,677 x 23 m).

For the 12-month period ending July 31, 2018, the airport had 6,328 aircraft operations, an average of 17 per day; they are categorized as 93.4% general aviation, 0.7% air taxi and 5.7% military. At that time, there were 41 aircraft based at this airport: 24 single engine, 12 multi-engine, four jets and one helicopter.

References

External links 
 Aerial photo from USGS The National Map via MSR Maps, 16 March 1997
 
 

Airports in Tennessee
Buildings and structures in Scott County, Tennessee